Yxlan is an island in the north of Stockholm archipelago and Norrtälje municipality. The island is reachable from the mainland by car ferries. Yxlan is located between the islands of Furusund and Blidö. There is a school and a little store on the island, other services is find on Blidö. Köpmanholm, Kolsvik, Yxlö and Vagnsunda is the main parts of the island.

References

Islands of Norrtälje Municipality
Islands of the Stockholm archipelago